The Musée de l'École de Nancy is a museum devoted to the École de Nancy, an Art Nouveau movement founded in 1901 by Émile Gallé, Victor Prouvé, Louis Majorelle, Antonin Daum and Eugène Vallin in the city of Nancy in Lorraine, north-eastern France. They were joined by other artists, notably Jacques Grüber.

The museum, opened in 1964, is set in the former house of a patron of the École de Nancy, Eugène Corbin. The architect was Lucien Weissenburger.  It has a garden, an aquarium pavilion, and the main building contains works by all the major Art Nouveau artists of Nancy, which was one of the major centers of the movement in Europe.

Gallery

References

External links

Tourist information about the museum
Official webpage of the museum

Musee de l'Ecole de Nancy
Musee de l'Ecole de Nancy
Art museums and galleries in France
Musee de l'Ecole de Nancy
Museums in Meurthe-et-Moselle
Art museums established in 1964
Musee de l'Ecole de Nancy
Musee de l'Ecole de Nancy
Musee de l'Ecole de Nancy
Art Nouveau museum buildings
Houses in France